The Orbiting Human Circus (of the Air) is a fictional radio drama podcast written and created by Julian Koster, and published by Night Vale Presents. It is the fourth podcast to be released under the Night Vale Presents name. The podcast stars Koster as Julian the janitor, a shy, sensitive employee of the Eiffel Tower who dreams of joining the fictional radio show also titled The Orbiting Human Circus of the Air, which is broadcast from a large ballroom at the top of the tower. Listeners of the podcast hear Julian the janitor's inner thoughts as he discusses his situations with The Narrator, played by Drew Callander, an imaginary voice only Julian can hear. In addition to the conversations in his head, Julian interacts with the staff and talent of The Orbiting Human Circus of the Air, notably voiced by actors such as John Cameron Mitchell, Cecil Baldwin, Tim Robbins, Charlie Day, and Mary Elizabeth Ellis. One of the most prominent themes of the podcast is the pain of loneliness. The first season of the podcasts comprised eight episodes as well as a bonus question and answer episode in which Koster answers questions submitted by fans.

From June to July 2017, the podcast released "an Orbiting Human Circus Special," titled "The 2nd Imaginary Symphony," which served as the official wide-release of Koster's 2002 album.

It was announced in January 2017 that the podcast would return for a second season.  The season, titled "Naughty Till New Years," premiered on November 6, 2019.

Production
The podcast was in development for several years prior to its eventual release, based on ideas Koster had been developing. Some of Koster's dialogue was recorded in his spare time during the Neutral Milk Hotel reunion tour, while Mitchell recorded much of his during his run in Hedwig and the Angry Inch on Broadway, both events having occurred over a year before the series' release. Koster cites British humor, specifically The Goon Show, as inspiration for some of the podcast's absurdism, in that jokes are delivered with little time for the audience to process the information.

To ensure authenticity, Koster employs equipment appropriate for the radio show world. All of Drew Callander's lines as the narrator are delivered through an authentic RCA Ribbon microphone from the 1930s.

Episodes

Season One

Season Two

Extras

References

External links
The Orbiting Human Circus of the Air homepage
The Orbiting Human Circus of the Air podcast page on iTunes

American radio dramas
2016 podcast debuts
Night Vale Presents